The Moorea Sandpiper (Prosobonia ellisi) is an extinct member of the large wader family Scolopacidae that was endemic to Mo'orea in French Polynesia, where the locals called it te-te in the Tahitian language.

Two specimens were collected by Georg Forster and William Anderson between September 30 and October 11, 1777, during Captain Cook's third voyage, but both have since disappeared and the bird became extinct in the nineteenth century. Several drawings of the bird were made by those accompanying Cook on his voyage; William Ellis and John Webber both illustrated the sandpiper between August-December of 1777. 

These illustrations show a somewhat lighter brown bird than the Tahiti Sandpiper, with no white spot behind the eye, a more conspicuous light rusty eye-ring, two white wing-bars and rusty secondary and primary coverts; one of Latham's specimens had yellow legs and feet. The exact relationships between the Moorea and Tahiti specimens are still not fully resolved, with some being unsure if they are separate species.

The Moorea Sandpiper was said to be found "close to small brooks" and it was still at least moderately common around 1776 - 1779 during Cook's last voyage. Invasive rats may have been a contributing factor in its fall to extinction.

References

Further reading
 Greenway, James C. (1967): Tahitian Sandpiper. In: Extinct and Vanishing Birds of the World (2nd ed.): 263–264. Dover Publications, New York.
 Latham, John (1785): "White-winged Sandpiper": In: A general synopsis of birds 3: 172, plate 82. London.
 Latham, John (1824): "White-winged Sandpiper": In: A general history of birds 9: 296.

External links
 BirdLife species factsheet. Retrieved 11-SEP-2006.

Prosobonia
Bird extinctions since 1500
Birds described in 1906
Birds of the Society Islands
Extinct birds of Oceania
Controversial bird taxa
Taxa named by Richard Bowdler Sharpe
Mo'orea